{{DISPLAYTITLE:C24H26N2O4}}
The molecular formula C24H26N2O4 (molar mass: 406.474 g/mol) may refer to:

 Carvedilol, a non-selective beta blocker/alpha-1 blocker indicated in the treatment of mild to moderate congestive heart failure
 Nicodicodeine, an opiate derivative developed as a cough suppressant and analgesic

Molecular formulas